The 1942 Llandaff and Barry by-election was held on 10 June 1942.  The by-election was held due to the death  of the incumbent Conservative MP, Patrick Munro.  It was won by the Conservative candidate Cyril Lakin.

References

1942 in Wales
1940s elections in Wales
1942 elections in the United Kingdom
By-elections to the Parliament of the United Kingdom in Welsh constituencies
1940s in Glamorgan
Politics of Glamorgan